Fixed Star is the seventh album from Arthur Loves Plastic and was released in 2001.

Release notes
"Ms. Arthur embraces the thrill of the dancefloor in these remixed tracks from Teflon Diva, Slice, and Klondyke 5."

Track listing

The Internat Archive version of Fixed Star includes full length versions of all the tracks, rather than the segued versions that appeared on the original release.

References

Arthur Loves Plastic albums
2001 albums